Kani Chay or Kani Chai may refer to:
 Kani Chay, Divandarreh
 Kani Chay, Qorveh